Czołczyn  is a village in the administrative district of Gmina Lutomiersk, within Pabianice County, Łódź Voivodeship, in central Poland.

The village has an approximate population of 200.

References

Villages in Pabianice County